Peace of Prague  may refer to:

 Peace of Prague (1635) - a peace settlement on 30 May 1635 between the Holy Roman Empire and most of the Empire's Lutheran provinces during the Thirty Years' War
 Peace of Prague (1866) - a peace settlement of 23 August 1866 between Prussia and Austria ending the Austro-Prussian War
 Treaty of Prague (1973) - part of Ostpolitik